"Wake Up Love" is a song by American singer Teyana Taylor, released as a single from her third studio album, The Album, on June 12, 2020, through GOOD Music and Def Jam Recordings. It features her husband Iman Shumpert. Taylor co-wrote the song with Shumpert, Cardiak, Steve M. Thornton II and Kesington Kross. The song's accompanying music video was released simultaneously during the song's release.

Charts

References

2020 singles
2020 songs
Teyana Taylor songs
Songs written by Teyana Taylor
Songs written by Cardiak
American contemporary R&B songs